Bhagaiya is a village panchayat in Godda district, Jharkhand state, India. Ranchi is the state capital for Bhagaiya village. Bhagaiya is known for traditional handloom silk manufacturing and weaving: that is why it is known as Resham (meaning Silk) Nagar . 

Bhagaiya has a temple of Lord Shiva in Middle, its surrounded by small hills and forests.

References

Villages in Godda district